Willibald Kreß (13 November 1906 – 27 January 1989) was a German footballer who participated at the 1934 FIFA World Cup.

Club career 
Kreß played club football with Rot-Weiß Frankfurt and Dresdner SC. In 1932, he was signed by FC Mulhouse but couldn't play a league match because of a DFB suspension.

International career 
Kreß won 16 caps for the Germany national team.

Coaching career 
He later managed FSV Frankfurt and Wuppertaler SV.

References

External links
 
 
 

1906 births
1989 deaths
German footballers
Footballers from Frankfurt
Association football goalkeepers
Germany international footballers
1934 FIFA World Cup players
Ligue 1 players
Rot-Weiss Frankfurt players
FC Mulhouse players
Dresdner SC players
Wuppertaler SV managers
Wormatia Worms managers
German football managers
FSV Frankfurt players
FSV Frankfurt managers
German expatriate footballers
German expatriate sportspeople in France
Expatriate footballers in France